The Men's Flyweight Weightlifting Event (– 52 kg) is the lightest men's event at the weightlifting competition, limiting competitors to a maximum of 52 kilograms of body mass. Each weightlifter had three attempts for both the snatch and clean and jerk lifting methods. The total of the best successful lift of each method was used to determine the final rankings and medal winners. Competition took place on 20 July in the Izmailovo Sports Palace.

The competition was very close with the top four lifters all having the same total. Kanybek Osmonaliyev won the gold medal as he was 0.2 kg lighter than Ho Bong-chol, while North Korean Han Gyong-si and Hungarian Béla Oláh both weighed 52.00 kg at the weigh-in before the event, but were re-weighed after the competition was over; Han Gyong-si weighed 0.1 kg less than Béla Oláh, and was thus awarded the bronze medal.

Results

New records

References 
 

Weightlifting at the 1980 Summer Olympics